Splendrillia bednalli is a species of sea snail, a marine gastropod mollusk in the family Drilliidae.

Description
(Original description) The length of the shell attains 16 mm, its diameter 5 mm. The white shell has an elongate-turreted shape with an acuminate spire. The shell contains 9½ convex, obtusely angulated whorls.  A very characteristic species, marked with brown transverse lines, about six on the body whorl. The specimens vary somewhat. The holotype is pretty distinctly longitudinally ribbed, and the ribs are raised to form a crown at the angle. In other individuals the ribs are obsolete, only the nodules at the angle remaining. The oblong aperture has a moderate width. The columella is slightly contorted.

Distribution
This marine species is endemic to Australia and occurs off South Australia

References

 Wells, F.E. 1990. Revision of the recent Australian Turridae referred to the genera Splendrillia and Austrodrillia. Journal of the Malacological Society of Australasia 11: 73–117

External links
  Tucker, J.K. 2004 Catalog of recent and fossil turrids (Mollusca: Gastropoda). Zootaxa 682:1–1295.
  Petit, R. E. (2009). George Brettingham Sowerby, I, II & III: their conchological publications and molluscan taxa. Zootaxa. 2189: 1–218

bednalli
Gastropods of Australia
Gastropods described in 1896